National Secondary Route 149, or just Route 149 (or ) is a National Road Route of Costa Rica, located in the Limón province.

Description
In Limón province the route covers Pococí canton (Guápiles district).

References

Highways in Costa Rica